Shredder Orpheus is a 1989 film by Robert McGinley that has later become a cult classic, based on the myth of Orpheus and Eurydice. It was Amy Denio's film debut.

Development
The movie was expanded from a previous short, Orpheus and Eurydice, into a feature-length film. Initially wanting to cast others as Orpheus, McGinley was convinced to take the role himself. Shot in Seattle, Washington, a majority of the film's locations were used illegally. The soundtrack was composed by Roland Barker.

Plot
In the Grey Zone, a nebulous post-apocalyptic community built out of shipping containers, Axel (Steven Jesse Bernstein), Scratch (Linda Severt), and Razoreus (Marshall Reid) distract themselves from ennui by skateboarding and listening to the music of Orpheus (Robert McGinley) and his band, the Shredders. On one such night, a mysterious cameraman films Orpheus's lover, Eurydice (Megan Murphy) and takes the footage to Hades (Gian-Carlo Scandiuzzi) and Persephone (Vera McCaughan), the managers of the Euthanasia Broadcast Network, or EBN.

The EBN programming brainwashes and sucks the souls out of the living, where they become part of the network. Needing fresh talent to corner the youth market, Hades sends his goons to murder and kidnap Eurydice at her wedding to Orpheus. Orpheus's manager, Linus (John Billingsley) gives the couple a "Gibsonian Lyre-Axe Guitar" supposedly made by Jimi Hendrix that can unlock new realms of human consciousness. With its power, Orpheus pursues Eurydice's captors through an EBN door.

Inside the EBN, Orpheus meets his parents, Apollo and Calliope, and barely escapes having his memories erased by a magic paper shredder that shreds the minds of incoming souls. Persephone takes an interest in Orpheus's arrival and helps him confront Hades on-air, and Orpheus's resulting performance convinces Hades to turn his quest into a ratings stunt: he'll let Orpheus and Eurydice go as long as he doesn't look back until they're both out. Due to Scratch calling her name, Orpheus turns around before Eurydice's fully out, and she's sent back to the EBN.

One year later, the EBN enjoys high ratings, while Orpheus has become a celebrity and drowns his sorrows in music and skateboarding. He has entered a depression over missing Eurydice, who has become a dancer for the network, and Linus and the others cover for missing gigs and have to remind him to eat. Orpheus's interest is piqued when Axel's gang mentions a gate to the underworld in a mysterious parking garage no one has successfully skated before, but when Linus suggests a tarot reading from an oracle, she cautions him against unnecessary risks. Meanwhile, Persephone wants Orpheus back on-air to encourage a better performance from Eurydice, and the EBN sends Orpheus a magic skateboard that lets him navigate the hellish parking garage.

Orpheus confronts Hades and is given another chance to save Eurydice in the form of a game show; one door leads to Eurydice, while the other leads to his death. Orpheus accepts the challenge, but unbeknownst to him, Eurydice is locked in her dressing room and thus neither door is correct. Upon choosing the wrong door, the Furies decapitate Orpheus with a chainsaw, and, in a moment staged by the EBN, Eurydice reunites with Orpheus in death. Hades and Persephone exult over the spectacle, while Orpheus's head is recovered by Razoreus. After a failed attempt to break into the garage, Axel and his gang strike against the EBN by blowing up one of their satellite dishes. The youth of the Grey Zone begin to look up to Orpheus, using his skull and music for skateboarding rituals. Axel expresses hope that one day they'll realize he risked everything, even himself, for love.

Cast

Release

Film festival
The film was shown at BAM Rose Cinemas on September 23, 2013. It was later shown again at The Brattle Theater in Cambridge, Massachusetts as part of the theater's "Trash Night" on May 19, 2015.

Soundtrack
On November 11, 2014, the film's remastered soundtrack was released on vinyl by Light in the Attic Records under its Traction imprint. The music was composed by Roland Barker, Bill Rieflin, Dennis Rea, and Amy Denio. It is the only release of the soundtrack. The vinyl includes 17 songs and comes bundled with a Shredder Orpheus DVD.

Reception
Nathan Phillips, writing for The Movie Elite said, "Shredder Orpheus is a love letter to independent artistry and ’80s counterculture that is, frankly, missing or underrepresented in today’s social climate, and if it were possible to be nostalgic about the future, it would be via the attitudes present in the future as seen in Shredder Orpheus, a blast from the past.".

References

External links

1980s science fiction films
Orpheus
1980s English-language films